Maisonnais is a commune in the Cher department in the Centre-Val de Loire region of France.

Geography
The river forms much of the commune’s southwestern border with the department of Indre.

Population

Sights
 The remains of several buildings from the medieval Orsan Priory.
 The church of Saints Peter and Paul, dating from the 12th century.
 The ornamental gardens of the priory.

See also
Communes of the Cher department

References

External links

The priory gardens at Maisonnais 

Communes of Cher (department)